Nipponoserica is a genus of May beetles and junebugs in the family Scarabaeidae. There are more than 20 described species in Nipponoserica.

Species
These 23 species belong to the genus Nipponoserica:

 Nipponoserica alloshanghaiensis Ahrens, Fabrizi & Liu, 2017
 Nipponoserica anjiensis Ahrens, Fabrizi & Liu, 2017
 Nipponoserica babai Kobayashi, 1991
 Nipponoserica camillerii Ahrens, Fabrizi & Liu, 2017
 Nipponoserica chinensis (Moser, 1915)
 Nipponoserica dahongshanica Ahrens, 2005
 Nipponoserica daisensis (Sawada, 1937)
 Nipponoserica elliptica (Murayama, 1938)
 Nipponoserica gomadana Nomura, 1976
 Nipponoserica henanensis Ahrens, Fabrizi & Liu, 2017
 Nipponoserica jiankouensis Ahrens, Fabrizi & Liu, 2017
 Nipponoserica koltzei (Reitter, 1897)
 Nipponoserica kunitachiana Nomura, 1976
 Nipponoserica laferi (Nikolajev, 1980)
 Nipponoserica mupuensis Ahrens, Fabrizi & Liu, 2017
 Nipponoserica peregrina (Chapin, 1938)
 Nipponoserica pubiventris Nomura, 1976
 Nipponoserica sericanioides Ahrens, Fabrizi & Liu, 2017
 Nipponoserica shanghaiensis Ahrens, 2004
 Nipponoserica similis (Lewis, 1895)
 Nipponoserica sulciventris Ahrens, 2004
 Nipponoserica takeuchii Hirasawa, 1991
 Nipponoserica wangi Ahrens, Fabrizi & Liu, 2017

References

Further reading

External links

 

Melolonthinae
Articles created by Qbugbot